Ayon may refer to:

People
Ayon (surname)

Places
Ayon, Russia, a rural locality (a selo) in Chaunsky District, Chukotka Autonomous Okrug, Russia
Ayon Island, an island off the coast of Chukotka, Russia